Dame Mary Guillan Smieton, DBE (5 December 1902 – 23 January 2005) was a British civil servant. She served as Permanent Secretary in the Ministry of Education between 1959 and 1963, only the second woman to achieve the rank of Permanent Secretary. Prior to this, she was Permanent Under-Secretary at the Ministry of Education, having joined the civil service in 1925. She studied at Bedford College, London (now Royal Holloway, University of London) and Lady Margaret Hall, Oxford.

References

1902 births
2005 deaths
Alumni of Lady Margaret Hall, Oxford
British civil servants
Civil servants in the Department of Education (United Kingdom)
British Permanent Secretaries
Dames Commander of the Order of the British Empire